Michal Šembera is a Grand Prix motorcycle racer from Czech Republic. He currently competes in the Alpe Adria Road Race Superbike Championship aboard a BMW S1000RR.

Career statistics

By season

Races by year
(key)

References

http://www.motogp.com/en/riders/Michal+Sembera

Czech motorcycle racers
1990 births
Living people
125cc World Championship riders
Sportspeople from Brno